Biquette (French "young female goat"), also known as Biquette de Mauriac, The Grindcore Goat or The Punk Rock Goat (ca. 2003 - December 2013), was a rescued factory milking goat, whose photos taken during metal concerts (as a part of the audience) became viral on the internet.

History 
According to Biquette's caretaker at a communal Ferme de Mauriac, the goat spent her first five years (probably ca. 2003–2008) at a milking factory before being handed over to Mauriac because "it was cheaper than a slaughterhouse". Biquette rose to popularity in early 2012 first, with photos and recordings of the band Wormrot concert in Mauriac, with Biquette in the front row. BuzzFeed dubbed Biquette "Punk Rock Goat", and Metal Insider called her photo "one of the best images in metal". According to the Wormrot's manager, Biquette was very tame, and followed the band around "like a dog".  The caretaker of Biquette, named Flo, said in an interview that the goat loved concerts and other gatherings of people and theorized that it liked the vibrations of the wooden floor caused by the live music. She also added that Biquette loved stealing cigarettes and cigarette butts, leftover alcohol, paint and oil drains. On December 9, 2013, Biquette's Facebook fan page alleged to the goat passing away, with Flo clarifying in a January 2014 interview that the cause of death was "a big mystery" and adding that given a 20-year average lifespan of a milking goat, Biquette "burned the candle at both ends" of her 10 years of life.

External links
 Biquette's Facebook fan page
 Youtube video of the Wormrot concert

References

2010s photographs
Animals on the Internet
Internet memes introduced in 2012
Individual goats